WFAJ (96.9 MHz) is a commercial FM radio station licensed to Nassawadox, Virginia, and serving the Eastern Shore of Virginia.  WFAJ is owned and operated by Hispanic Target Media, Inc.  It carries a Spanish-language Regional Mexican radio format, known as "Radio Amigo."  Programming is shared on a number of similar stations in the U.S., all known as Radio Amigo.

The station signed on the air in 2010.  It has used the WFAJ call sign for its entire history.

References

External links
 Hispanic Target Media Stations
 

2010 establishments in Virginia
Spanish-language radio stations in the United States
Radio stations established in 2010
FAJ